The Longdong stream salamander (Batrachuperus londongensis) is a species of salamander in the family Hynobiidae endemic to Sichuan, China, where it is found in the Longdong River on Mount Emei. Its natural habitats are rivers and freshwater springs. It is threatened by habitat loss.

References

Batrachuperus
Taxonomy articles created by Polbot
Amphibians described in 1978
Endangered Fauna of China